Big Data is an American electronic music project created by producer Alan Wilkis. Big Data is best known for the single "Dangerous", featuring Joywave, which reached number one on the Billboard Alternative Songs chart in August 2014, and was certified gold by the RIAA in May 2015.

Big Data's first EP, 1.0, was released on October 1, 2013, on Wilkis's own Wilcassettes label and features the songs "The Stroke of Return", "Dangerous", "Big Dater", and "Bombs over Brooklyn". In early December 2013, they also released a remix EP, 1.5, which included eight remixes of the song "Dangerous", including one by Joywave. Another remix EP, 1.6, was released in late September 2014, and included seven remixes of "Dangerous".

Big Data's first studio album, 2.0, was released on March 20, 2015. Their second album, 3.0, was released on July 26, 2019.

Discography

Studio albums

Singles

As lead artist

Promotional singles

Extended plays

References

External links
 Official website

Musical groups from Brooklyn
Musical groups established in 2013
Alternative rock groups from New York (state)
Electronic music groups from New York (state)
Warner Records artists
2013 establishments in New York City